An owlet is a young owl.

Owlet may also refer to:

Animals
 A number of small species of owls in the family Strigidae
 Owlet moth, a family in Noctuidae
 Owlet-nightjar, small crepuscular birds related to the nightjars and frogmouths

Other uses
 Owlet, West Yorkshire, a locality near Bradford, England
 General Aircraft Owlet, a single-engined trainer aircraft

Animal common name disambiguation pages